Moodley is a surname. Notable people with the surname include:

Kogila Moodley, Canadian academic
Mary Moodley (1913–1979), South African trade unionist and anti-apartheid activist
Preshanthan Moodley (born 1988), South African film and television director
Strini Moodley (1945–2006), South African activist

See also
Mudaliar